Mom is an American sitcom that premiered on September 23, 2013, on CBS. The series was created by Chuck Lorre, Eddie Gorodetsky and Gemma Baker. It follows Christy Plunkett (Anna Faris), a single mother who, upon reaching a turning point in her battle with alcoholism and drug addiction, decides to restart her life in Napa, California's wine country, working as a waitress at the restaurant Rustic Fig and attending Alcoholics Anonymous meetings. Her mother Bonnie Plunkett (Allison Janney) is also a recovering drug and alcohol addict who attempts to have a healthy romantic relationship with her fiancé, Adam (William Fichtner), a paraplegic ex-stuntman; and her 17-year-old daughter Violet (Sadie Calvano) — born when Christy was just 16 – was herself pregnant by way of her boyfriend Luke (Spencer Daniels) in season 1. Christy also has a younger son Roscoe (Blake Garrett Rosenthal) by her ex-husband Baxter (Matt L. Jones), a deadbeat marijuana addict in the first season. Through it all, Christy and Bonnie rely on their support system from AA, including the wise Marjorie (Mimi Kennedy), the wealthy and sometimes misguided Jill (Jaime Pressly), the overly emotional Wendy (Beth Hall), and the loudmouth but sweet Tammy (Kristen Johnston). Collectively, they help each other stay sober in the face of whatever life throws at them. Recurring characters in the first few seasons include: Gabriel (Nate Corddry), the manager of Rustic Fig and Rudy (French Stewart), Rustic Fig’s head chef.
 
With the exception of the pilot, episode titles contain two odd topics (often unrelated) that are mentioned in that episode's dialogue. In February 2019, CBS renewed the series for a seventh and eighth season, with the seventh season which premiered on September 26, 2019. The eighth season premiered on November 5, 2020. On February 17, 2021, it was announced that the eighth season would be the series' final season.

Series overview

Episodes

Season 1 (2013–14)

Season 2 (2014–15)

Season 3 (2015–16)

Season 4 (2016–17)

Season 5 (2017–18)

Season 6 (2018–19)

Season 7 (2019–20)

Season 8 (2020–21)

References

External links 
 
 

Mom (TV series)
Lists of American sitcom episodes